Dublin High School is a public high school in Dublin, Georgia, United States. The school serves grades 9-12 for the Dublin City School District.

Demographics
The demographic breakdown of the 616 students enrolled for 2017-18 was:
Male - 48.7%
Female - 51.3%
Asian - 1.0%
Black - 90.6%
Hispanic - 1.1%
Native Hawaiian/Pacific islanders - 0.2%
White - 5.0%
Multiracial - 2.1%

100% of the students were eligible for free or reduced-cost lunch. For 2017–18, this was a Title I school.

Athletics 
The following sports are offered at Dublin:

Baseball (boys')
Basketball (boys' & girls')
Boys State Champions - 2006 & 2009
Cheerleading (girls')
State Champions - 1999
Cross country (boys' & girls')
Football (boys')
State champions - 1959, 1960, 1963, 2006 (tied), 2019
Golf (boys' & girls')
Boys' state champion - 1962, 1964, & 1965
Soccer (boys' & girls')
Softball (girls')
Slow-pitch state champions - 1996 & 1997
Tennis (boys' & girls')
Track & field (boys' & girls')
Boys State Champions - 1951
Volleyball (girls')
Wrestling (boys')
State champion (Traditional) - 2002, 2004
State champion (Dual) - 2004

References

External links
 Dublin High School
 Dublin City School District

Schools in Laurens County, Georgia
Public high schools in Georgia (U.S. state)
Schools accredited by the Southern Association of Colleges and Schools